Pearl of the Dane is a former Seafood restaurant in Congleton, Cheshire.

History
Pearl of the Dane was built as the Danish fishing trawler Limanda in 1974.

In 1996 the Limanda was bought by in Anglesey by Joe Terry a Congleton businessman.

The Limanda was transported to Congleton in September 1996, however due to the size of the ship only the hull was transported to Congleton.

A special dry dock was built in Congleton for the Limanda to be docked at.

Keeping with the theme of seafood the structure around the hull was built to resemble a 1920s steamboat.

Parts used in the refurbishment of the hull of the Limanda to turn it into a restaurant were bought from scrapyards in Holland and Denmark.

Pearl of the Dane was also known as the Congleton Steamboat.

Pearl of the Dane opened in December 1997, and was successful in its first year of operation.

The success of Pearl of the Dane did not last long, and it closed in the autumn of 1999 due to low trade.

In the past the former restaurant has been subject of vandalism.

There have been plans in the past to reopen the restaurant, but these plans have never come to anything.

Due to the current condition of the Pearl of the Dane it is considered by locals to be an "Eyesore".

References

Restaurants in Cheshire
Floating restaurants